Balloon Command was the Royal Air Force command which was responsible for controlling all the United Kingdom-based barrage balloon units during the Second World War.

History 
Prior to the establishment of Balloon Command, a balloon group was brought into being in 1937.  This smaller formation was known as No. 30 (Balloon Barrage) Group and was commanded by Air Commodore John Hearson. Balloon Command itself was formed on 1 November 1938 at RAF Stanmore Park in Middlesex. It consisted of a headquarters and several groups. Balloon Command was disbanded in February 1945.

Commanders
The following officers were in command:

1 November 1938 Air Vice-Marshal Owen Tudor Boyd
1 December 1940 Air Marshal Sir Leslie Gossage
1 February 1944 Air Vice-Marshal W C C Gell
13 February 1945 Air Commodore P L Lincoln

Pre-war organization 
Before the second world war the command had one group - No. 30 (Balloon) Group at four stations:
No. 1 Balloon Centre at Kidbrooke
No. 901 (County of London) (Balloon) Squadron Auxiliary Air Force
No. 902 (County of London) (Balloon) Squadron Auxiliary Air Force
No. 903 (County of London) (Balloon) Squadron Auxiliary Air Force
No. 2 Balloon Centre at Hook
No. 904 (County of Surrey) (Balloon) Squadron Auxiliary Air Force
No. 905 (County of Surrey) (Balloon) Squadron Auxiliary Air Force
No. 3 Balloon Centre at Stanmore
No. 906 (County of Middlesex) (Balloon) Squadron Auxiliary Air Force
No. 907 (County of Middlesex) (Balloon) Squadron Auxiliary Air Force
No. 4 Balloon Centre at Chigwell
No. 908 (County of Essex) (Balloon) Squadron Auxiliary Air Force
No. 909 (County of Essex) (Balloon) Squadron Auxiliary Air Force
No. 910 (County of Essex) (Balloon) Squadron Auxiliary Air Force
Important:  All Balloon Squadrons numbered 901 to 947 were formed within the Auxiliary Air Force (AAF) prior to the outbreak of war in September 1939, thereafter, the remainder numbered 948 to 999 were RAF Squadrons.

Second world war organization 
During World War II, the command had the following organization:
Headquarters at Old Church Lane, Stanmore in Middlesex.  This in turn directly controlled:
RAF Cardington
RAF Chessington
The command consisted of five groups which were in turn subdivided into balloon centres (equivalent to wings of heavier-than-air aircraft).  The organization was as follows:
No. 30 Group headquartered at Chessington, near Surbiton, Surrey (1 November 1938 to 7 January 1945)
No. 1 Balloon Centre
No. 2 Balloon Centre
No. 3 Balloon Centre
No. 4 Balloon Centre
No. 12 Balloon Centre
No. 31 Group (1 April 1939 to 13 November 1941), Birmingham
No. 32 Group headquartered at Claverton Manor, Claverton, near Bath, Somerset (1 March 1939 to 15 November 1944)
No. 6 Balloon Centre (earlier in 33 Group)
No. 11 Balloon Centre
No. 13 Balloon Centre
No. 14 Balloon Centre
No. 33 Group headquartered at Parkhead House, Abbey Lane, Sheffield, Yorkshire (1 March 1939 to 4 September 1944)
No. 5 Balloon Centre
No. 6 Balloon Centre (later in 32 Group)
No. 8 Balloon Centre
No. 9 Balloon Centre
No. 10 Balloon Centre
No. 15 Balloon Centre (earlier in 34 Group)
No. 16 Balloon Centre
No. 17 Balloon Centre
No. 34 Group headquartered at Tor House, Corstorphine Road, Edinburgh (7 April 1940 to 19 July 1943)
No. 15 Balloon Centre (later in 33 Group)
No. 18 Balloon Centre

The dates indicated give the periods for which each group existed as part of Balloon Command.  No. 30 and 31 groups also existed in World War I as part of different formations.

The balloon centres in turn consisted of balloon squadrons which were numbered from 900 to 994.

See also
 Royal Auxiliary Air Force
 List of Royal Air Force commands

References

External links
Balloon Barrage Reunion Club Website - Development of Balloon Command

Balloon Command
Military units and formations established in 1938
Ballooning